Travis Ryan Collins (born August 3, 1983), who goes by the stage name Travis Ryan, is an American Christian musician. He released a studio album in 2012, Fearless, with Integrity Music. He is most known for co-writing "We Believe" with Richie Fike, Matt Hooper. The song was popularized by the Christian band Newsboys.

Early life
Collins was born as Travis Ryan Collins,  in San Clemente, California on August 3, 1983, to a songwriter and worship leader father. Collins was an associate producer for Maranatha! Music. He later became a worship leader at Saddleback Church, then at LifePoint Church in Smyrna, Tennessee.

Music career
He started his music recording career in 2012, with his first studio album, Fearless, and it released on April 10, 2012, from Integrity Music.

Integrity Music released two of his musical compositions on May 13, 2016: Heartbeat, his third EP, and Until My Voice Is Gone, his first live album.

In 2019, Phil Wickham released his album Living Hope, for which Ryan co-wrote the song "My All in All."

Personal life
Travis Ryan Collins is married to Hayley, where together they have five children, three sons and two daughters.

Discography

Albums
 Travis Ryan (March 10, 2009 - Independent)
 Fearless (April 10, 2012, Integrity Music)

Live albums
 Until My Voice Is Gone (May 13, 2016, Integrity)

EPs
 Travis Ryan (July 23, 2008, Independent)
 You Hold It All (August 28, 2015, Integrity)
 Heartbeat (May 13, 2016, Integrity)

Songs
 "We Believe"

References

External links
 Official website

1983 births
Living people
American performers of Christian music
Musicians from California
Songwriters from California